Lugar may refer to:

People
Richard Lugar (1932–2019), United States senator
Robert Lugar (1773–1855), English architect and engineer

Places and landmarks
Lugar (country subdivision), in Portugal and Spain
Lugar, East Ayrshire, a small village in southwest Scotland
Lugar Research Center, a laboratory in Tbilisi, Georgia

Other uses
Lugar Water, a river in Scotland
Lugar Heights, an animated television series

See also
Luger (disambiguation)